Tarache areloides is a moth of the family Noctuidae first described by William Barnes and James Halliday McDunnough in 1912. It is found in the US states of Arizona and New Mexico.

The length of the forewings is 12–14 mm for both males and females. Adults are on wing from July to September depending on the location.

External links
 

Acontiinae
Moths of North America
Taxa named by William Barnes (entomologist)
Taxa named by James Halliday McDunnough
Moths described in 1912